Caroline Crossing is a rural locality in the Shire of Murweh, Queensland, Australia.

Caroline Crossing does not have a postcode, as it is grouped with Augathella for postal purposes.

History 
The locality was named and bounded on 28 March 2002. It is presumably named after the ford across the Warrego River known as Caroline Crossing.

Road infrastructure
The Landsborough Highway runs past the western extremity, near Augathella.

References 

Shire of Murweh
Localities in Queensland